Dava is a fictional character in the DC Comics universe. She is a martial artist created by writer Chuck Dixon and artist Staz Johnson, and she first appeared in Robin #49 (1998).

Detailed history
Dava Sbörsc's homeland of Tbliska was left in ruins by a long and bloody civil war, with the country being divided into the two countries Krasna-Volny and Transbelvia, neither of which acknowledges its neighbor as a true country. Both sides committed numerous atrocities in the war, which left thousands dead. When very young, Dava joined the Transbelvian army and pledged herself to hunting down and killing the worst killers in the Krasna-Volnian army. Being fast but small, Dava realized she would have to end any combat quickly if she was to win. To that end, she committed herself to learning all "single-blow techniques" - martial arts attacks that can defeat a foe with a single attack. She had mastered almost all known single-blow attacks (including "The Scalpel", "The Wind Through the Reeds", "The Lion's Paw", "Wave and Shore" and "The Skullcrack") when she sought out The Master of the Iron Hand, to learn his technique "The Whispering Hand". While learning from the Iron Master, she encountered Tim Drake (Robin), who was also studying with the Master at the time. She greatly impressed Robin, defeating him in a sparring match with astonishing speed. Robin, in turn, impressed her when he skillfully dispatched a thief seeking to take the dojo's texts. Dava confided in Robin that she also intended to seek out Lady Shiva to learn the Leopard Blow technique. Tim was greatly troubled by this, as he had met Shiva in the past and knew what a ruthless killer she was.

Shiva, meanwhile, had become interested upon discovering the existence of a master of single blow attacks. Dava had previously killed the crew of a ship carrying weapons to Krasna-Volny, killing each crew member with one of her techniques. This allowed Shiva to track Dava to the Master of the Iron Hand's dojo. Dava, having learned the Whispering Hand, had already left to return to Transbelvia. When Shiva arrived at the dojo, she challenged the Iron Master (whose brother, The Armless Master she had killed previously, during the Knightfall storyline) when he would not reveal Dava's identity or whereabouts. Realizing that he was helpless against Shiva, Robin followed the Iron Master's wishes and left the Master to battle Shiva. Shiva soon killed the Iron Master in combat, but was stalled enough to give Tim a head start in tracking down and warning Dava.

Dava had returned to her homeland, where Sir Edmund Dorrace (the ruthless drug lord arms dealer and blind martial artist King Snake) was supplying the Krasna-Volnian army with weapons to wipe out Dava's country of Transbelvia.  The ship whose crew Dava had killed earlier had been carrying a shipment from Sir Edmund to Krasna-Volvy, and she had destroyed the weapons, forcing Sir Edmund to accompany the next shipment to guarantee its safety.

Robin, meanwhile, had tracked Dava down, only to find that she was unconcerned about Shiva. Still wishing to protect Dava from Shiva (Tim was troubled during this period because he had recently failed to save a life), he was forced to accompany her on a mission to fight Dvak Tvorakovich, a Krasna-Volvian General who had killed entire Transbelvian villages during the war. When they confronted the General the two were immediately surrounded by armed guards. However, Dava kissed Robin at that point, and to Robin's surprise, he immediately found himself super-fast and super-strong, allowing him to defeat the armed guards with ease. Dava used the oil of the Aramilla plant on herself, which gave her superhuman speed and agility (and possibly strength, although this is unclear), and some of this had been transferred in the kiss.

Shiva arrived right after the troops had been defeated and the General had fled, and challenged Dava to a death match. Robin attempted to save Dava, but since he was still under the effects of the Aramilla plant, he did not realize his own speed and strength, and accidentally killed the normally unbeatable Shiva. Dava was unmoved, although Robin was furious with her for making him break his oath to never take a life. At that point, King Snake arrived with more armed Kransa-Volvian troops, seeking to avenge his earlier losses at Robin's hands. Robin resuscitated Shiva, but in the process, transferred some of the Aramilla drug to her, briefly giving her superhuman speed and agility. Although King Snake escaped, Shiva quickly killed the troops, meanwhile General Tvorakovich was killed in an explosion he had intended for his ally King Snake. Feeling that there was no more he could do, Robin left Dava, who angrily defended her path of vengeance-murder as he departed.

Appearance
Dava's design is clearly intended to resemble Robin's, emphasizing the similarities between the characters.  Her costume is made up of elements more in keeping with the real world than Robin's (such as a trenchcoat instead of a cape, and war paint on her face instead of a mask). Aside from their different genders, the most obvious (and possibly symbolic) difference in their designs is their hair, with Robin's being dark, and Dava's hair being red.

References

DC Comics martial artists